YHI may refer to:

 YHI, the IATA code for Ulukhaktok/Holman Airport in the Northwest Territories, Canada.
 Yhi, a goddess of light and creation in Australian Aboriginal mythology
 YHI International Limited, a Singapore-based multinational engineering company
 Yhi yindi, a species of amphipod crustacean